Math Blaster Jr. is a 1996 educational video game, aimed at ages 4–7. The game was re-released as Math Blaster: Ages 4 - 6 in 1997.

Production
The game was officially announced by Davidson & Associates in February 1996 as a spin-off to the 1982 title Math Blaster! intended to "introduce young learners to essential math skills and build math confidence"; at the time of the announcement, the game was expected to be released on the second quarter 1996. The game was eventually released that year.

Jan Davidson, president and founder of Davidson & Associates, explained that once players master this game, they are expected to graduate to Math Blaster 1, which is the narrative successor.

Gameplay
The game sees the Blaster Pal characters head to the Plusto galaxy in outer space to solve maths problems. By solving addition and subtraction problems, they earn printable certificates. The game contains a number of activities, puzzles, and songs. The game is intended to encourage "math readiness".

Critical reception

PC Mag praised the game for effortlessly introducing maths concepts with humour, 3D graphics, and age appropriate music, noting that it would appeal to adults as well as children. Black Enterprise recommended the game as a perfect preschool gift for the holiday season, along with Nick Jr. Play Math (Viacom New Media), JumpStart Preschool (Knowledge Adventure), Schoolhouse Rock: Grammar Rock (Creative Wonders), School Zone's Alphabet Express (School Zone Publishing), Reading Blaster Jr. (Davidson & Associates), Money Town (Davidson & Associates), Kid Pack 2 Deluxe (WizardWorks), and Reader Rabbit's Reading Development Library 1-4 (The Learning Company).

References

1996 video games
Children's educational video games
Classic Mac OS games
Windows games
Mathematical education video games
Video games developed in the United States
Single-player video games
Davidson & Associates games